The Valencia Giants are an American football team based in Valencia, Spain.

The Giants compete in LNFA Serie A, the top division of American football in Spain.

External links
Official website

American football teams established in 2003
2003 establishments in Spain
American football teams in Spain
Sport in Valencia
Sports teams in the Valencian Community